Pelahatchie Creek is a stream in the U.S. state of Mississippi.

Pelahatchie is a name derived from the Choctaw language purported to mean "place where a hurricane passed along and blew down the timber". Variant names are "Pelahatchee Creek" and "Pelahatches Creek".

References

Rivers of Mississippi
Rivers of Rankin County, Mississippi
Rivers of Scott County, Mississippi
Mississippi placenames of Native American origin